The 2008 Wakefield Metropolitan District Council election took place on 1 May 2008 to elect members of Wakefield Metropolitan District Council in West Yorkshire, England. One third of the council was up for election and the Labour party stayed in overall control of the council.

After the election, the composition of the council was
Labour 32
Conservative 23
Independent 6
Liberal Democrat 2

Background
Before the election there was disagreement among commentators about how safe Wakefield council was for Labour. The Daily Telegraph felt Labour would struggle to remain in control, but the Yorkshire Post believed it would remain safe for Labour.

Wakefield council joined with other councils from Yorkshire to run a television advertising campaign in an attempt to increase turnout.

Election result
The results saw the Conservatives make 7 gains, all but one from Labour, and come up only one seat short of depriving Labour of their majority. Altogether Labour lost 8 seats including 2 to independents, while the Liberal Democrats lost their only seat that was being contested in Ossett to the Conservatives. Labour losses included the mayor, Allan Garbutt, and the cabinet member for children and young people, Trevor Izon, in Pontefract South. Overall turnout was 32.28%.

The Conservatives said that their victories were due both to the unpopularity of the national Labour government and due to the Labour council behaving in an arrogant way.  The results were seen by the Conservatives as an encouraging sign of how they would perform at the next general election in the Wakefield constituencies. Meanwhile, Labour put their defeats down to national issues such as the abolition of the 10p rate of income tax and immigration.

Ward results

References

2008 English local elections
2008
2000s in West Yorkshire